Philippe Marocco (born 14 June 1960 in Cintegabelle) is a former French rugby union player and a current coach. He played as a prop and as a hooker.

Marocco did his career at Montferrand, where he won the Challenge Yves du Manoir Cup in 1985/86 and finished runner-up in the 1993/94 Championship.

He had 21 caps for France, from 1986 to 1991, scoring 1 try, 4 points in aggregate. He played four times at the Five Nations Championship, in 1986, 1989, 1990 and 1991. He won two titles, in 1986, ex-aequo with Scotland, and 1989. He was selected for the 1991 Rugby World Cup, playing four games but without scoring.

He is the coach of A.S St.Junien Rugby, since 2011/12.

References

External links

1960 births
Living people
French rugby union players
France international rugby union players
Rugby union props
Rugby union hookers
Sportspeople from Haute-Garonne
ASM Clermont Auvergne players